Butte Saint Paul State Recreation Area is a public recreation area located  northwest of Dunseith in Bottineau County, North Dakota. The state park unit encompasses  Butte Saint Paul. A  stone cairn and commemorative plaque sit atop the peak.  A circular trail to the top of the peak allows hikers to take in expansive views of the surrounding Turtle Mountain region.

History
In January 1850, Jesuit missionary Georges-Antoine Belcourt and a small traveling party survived a blizzard by digging into the snow atop the peak.  Belcourt erected a wooden cross on the summit and christened the peak Butte Saint Paul, as that day was the Feast of the Conversion of Saint Paul the Apostle.  The remains of the cross were rediscovered in the 1930s and were commemorated with a stone cairn and the declaration of a  state park.

References

External links
Butte Saint Paul State Recreation Area North Dakota Parks and Recreation Department

Buttes of North Dakota
State parks of North Dakota
Protected areas of Bottineau County, North Dakota
Landforms of Bottineau County, North Dakota
Protected areas established in 1933
1933 establishments in North Dakota